Ferme de Moras Aerodrome,  was a temporary World War I airfield in France.  It was  East of the commune of La Ferté-sous-Jouarre, in the Île-de-France region in north-central France.

Overview
The airfield was a temporary facility created by the French Aeronautique Militaire in late 1917, operational until December 1918, which means that it probably consisted of several wood-and-fabric "Bessonneau" hangars, plus wooden huts.

It was used for a short spell during summer 1918 by the I Corps Observation Group, during the Aisne-Marne Offensive Campaign. The two group's squadrons, 1st and 12th Aero Squadron operated from the field until moving out at the beginning of August to May-en-Multien Aerodrome, as did the group's HQ.

The last French "escadrille" left on 1 December 1918, and the airfield was soon cleared of all its building and returned to agricultural use.  Today it is a series of cultivated fields located on the plateau 2 miles east of La Ferté sous Jouarre, north of D 407.

Known units assigned
 I Corps Observation Group HQ 30 July - 5 August 1918 
 1st Aero Squadron (Observation) 22 July - 5 August 1918
 12th Aero Squadron (Observation) 22 July - 3 August 1918

See also

 List of Air Service American Expeditionary Force aerodromes in France

References

 Series "D", Volume 2, Squadron histories,. Gorrell's History of the American Expeditionary Forces Air Service, 1917–1919, National Archives, Washington, D.C.

External links

World War I sites of the United States
World War I airfields in France